Tazeh Kand-e Qeshlaq may refer to:
 Tazeh Kand-e Qeshlaq, East Azerbaijan
 Tazeh Kand-e Qeshlaq, West Azerbaijan